No Time to Die is a 2021 spy film and the 25th film in the James Bond series.

No Time to Die may also refer to:
 "No Time to Die" (song), by Billie Eilish, 2020
 No Time to Die (1958 film), a British-American war film by Terence Young
 "No Time to Die" (Columbo), an episode of Columbo
  (Danger - No Time to Die), an 1984 film by Helmuth Ashley 
 No Time to Die (2006 film), a German-Ghanaian film by King Ampaw
 No Time to Die, a 2014 novel by Kira Peikoff

See also
 A Time to Die (disambiguation)